Sunderland Aquatic Centre is an indoor sports complex next to the Stadium of Light in the city of Sunderland, England. It contains an Olympic-size swimming pool, a diving pool and a gymnasium. It is the only full Olympic-standard pool in North East England between Glasgow and Leeds.

The centre was opened on 18 April 2008 with a fireworks and lights display. Anne, Princess Royal visited the Aquatic Centre on 22 January 2009 and gave it a second 'opening' ceremony. A third ceremony was held in the presence of the Mayor of Sunderland Mary Smith later that year.

It replaced the swimming pool and gymnasium facilities at the Crowtree Leisure Centre which was opened in 1978 by Prince Charles. The pool at Crowtree had a tropical beach style with a slide, two diving pools and a wave machine, and was not an Olympic-standard pool.  The centre was closed to the general public in October 2011 and demolished in 2013.

On 16 June 2012, the Olympic torch was carried through the Aquatic Centre as part of the 2012 Summer Olympics torch relay.

In February 2017, Sunderland City Council announced that the centre would have to be closed for up to nine months to make structural repairs to the roof, after leaks were reported. They also confirmed they were taking legal action against builder Balfour Beatty. In August 2018, an out-of-court agreement was reached, and Balfour Beatty committed to carry out a programme of work to repair the roof.

See also
List of Olympic-size swimming pools in the United Kingdom

References

External links
Sunderland Aquatic Centre website
BBC Wear's features and pictures of Sunderland Aquatic Centre
 Achtformpool

Swimming venues in England
Tourist attractions in the City of Sunderland
Buildings and structures in the City of Sunderland
Sunderland